BeaconLight Trust is a non-denominational Christian training organisation that provides biblical training resources. BeaconLight is a registered charity (no. 1047046), a member of Global Connections and the Evangelical Alliance.

History 
BeaconLight started in 1995, running face-to-face training courses, predominantly in South-East England. These courses involved participants from approx. 400 churches, and were normally based at Banstead Baptist Church. Since 2007, BeaconLight has offered free-to-use training resources over the internet. In 2009 BeaconLight published its first book, Truth Direct.

Word@Work 
In November 2007, BeaconLight began offering a daily devotional email service named Word@Work.  The stated aim of this service is to encourage people at work to apply the Bible's teaching to their working lives. Word@Work has garnered praise within the evangelical blogosphere, and its readership has grown to 30,000 readers worldwide (as at April 2011).

References

External links
 BeaconLight
 Word@Work
 CrossCheck
 Global Connections
 Evangelical Alliance

Evangelical parachurch organizations
Christian organizations established in the 20th century
Christian organizations established in 1995
Non-profit organisations based in the United Kingdom